Avant-prog (short for avant-garde progressive rock) is a music genre that appeared in the late 1970s as the extension of two separate progressive rock subgenres: Rock in Opposition (RIO) and the Canterbury scene.

History and characteristics 

A host of groups and artists mainly from the United States, but also from Europe and Japan, "started to write mostly short instrumental pieces that focused on complexity and stripped down instrumentation, while avoiding the pomposity and stage props of the big progressive rock acts." Some groups, such as Thinking Plague and the Motor Totemist Guild,  kept working with long durations and rich instrumentation but also forayed into free improvisation, sound collage, and other avant-garde techniques. These artists cumulated on record labels such as Cuneiform (United States), Recommended (later ReR Megacorp, England) and Rec Rec (Switzerland).

See also
 Experimental rock
 Magma (known for developing Zeuhl)
 Henry Cow (known for creating Rock in Opposition)

References

20th-century music genres
Rock music genres
Progressive rock
Prog